Star Wars is an action game based on the 1977 film of the same name. It was released by Victor Musical Industries for the Family Computer in Japan on November 15, 1991 and by JVC Musical Industries for the Nintendo Entertainment System in North America in November 1991 and in Europe on March 26, 1992. An official mail order "Hint Book" was available for the game upon its release.

Two versions for handheld game consoles were released. The Game Boy port was developed by NMS Software and published by Capcom and released shortly less than a year later in 1992. The Game Gear port was developed by Tiertex Design Studios and published by U.S. Gold and released in 1993. A Master System version was also released.

The game was followed by a sequel, Star Wars: The Empire Strikes Back, but an NES game adaptation of Return of the Jedi was never realized. A counterpart of the game for the Super NES, Super Star Wars, was released as well. On June 28, 2019, the NES and Game Boy versions were officially re-released in both standard and Collector's Edition sets with Disney and Lucasfilm's approval in limited quantities on unlicensed replica game cartridges by Limited Run Games.

Gameplay

The game follows a sequence of events close to the storyline of A New Hope, where Luke Skywalker has to pilot a landspeeder around Tatooine, collect R2-D2 from the Sandcrawler, Obi-Wan Kenobi from a cave, and Han Solo from the Mos Eisley bar, while fighting stormtroopers, sand people, and many other different enemy characters from the movies. After assembling all the characters, the player navigates the Millennium Falcon in a first-person perspective through an asteroid field to the Death Star (shields for the Millennium Falcon to withstand the asteroid field must also be collected in the Tatooine levels). Once arriving at the Death Star, the player is required to destroy the tractor beam generator, rescue Princess Leia from the detention block, then proceed to destroy the Death Star with the rebel fighters.

The Game Gear version has a few exclusive levels. The first level has Leia delivering the stolen plans to R2-D2. The speeder overworld is replaced with three side-scrolling levels through the desert where Luke has to travel on foot.

Each character has different attributes. Han Solo and Leia can also be used to replace Luke in gameplay, but unlike Luke who has numerous lives, Han and Leia only have one life each. Obi-Wan Kenobi can resurrect Han Solo or Princess Leia five times (in the Game Gear and Master System versions, the player is even required to kill and resurrect them in order to earn the last 10% completion points and see the ending), R2-D2 can display a map of the Death Star hallways, and C-3PO can provide information on the current part of the game. Darth Vader makes his only appearance on the Game Over screen.

Chewbacca appears at the end of the Game Boy version, and is mentioned in passing a few times. It is noted in the instruction manual that Chewie flies the Millennium Falcon if Han Solo dies.

Reception

Victor Lucas of The Electric Playground gave the Game Gear version a 7 out of 10 and wrote, "Star Wars does feature some impressive artistic design and a few technical surprises. It's still one of the sharpest looking games available for Sega's 8-bit portable".

References

External links

Star Wars (Game Gear) at the Internet Archive

1991 video games
Capcom games
Game Boy games
Game Gear games
LucasArts games
Master System games
Nintendo Entertainment System games
NMS Software games
Platform games
Single-player video games
Star Wars (film) video games
Tiertex Design Studios games
U.S. Gold games
Ubisoft games
Video games developed in Australia